Robert Wiene (27 April 1873 – 17 July 1938) was a film director of the silent era of German cinema. He is particularly known for directing the German silent film The Cabinet of Dr. Caligari and a succession of other expressionist films. Wiene also directed a variety of other films of varying styles and genres. Following the Nazi rise to power in Germany, Wiene, who was of Jewish descent, fled into exile.

Biography

Early life
Robert Wiene was born in Breslau, in the German Province of Silesia (now the city of Wrocław in Poland), as the elder son of the successful theatre actor Carl Wiene. His younger brother Conrad also became an actor, but Robert Wiene at first studied law at the University of Berlin.

Career in Germany
In 1908 he also started to act, at first in small parts on stage. His first involvement with film was in 1912, writing and (possibly) directing Die Waffen der Jugend.

His most memorable feature films are the horror film The Cabinet of Dr. Caligari (1920) and Raskolnikow (1923), an adaptation of Dostoyevsky's Crime and Punishment, both of which had a deep influence on the German cinema of that time.

Exile and death
Four months after the Nazis took power, Wiene's latest film, Taifun, was banned on 3 May 1933. A Hungarian film company had been inviting German directors to come to Budapest to make films in simultaneous German/Hungarian versions, and given his uncertain career prospects under the new German regime Wiene took up that offer in September to direct "One Night in Venice" (1934). Wiene went later to London, and finally to Paris where together with Jean Cocteau he tried to produce a sound remake of The Cabinet of Dr. Caligari.

Wiene never returned to Germany, although the reason is unclear. He had no connection to left-wing politics, and had collaborated with Nazi favorite Richard Strauss on "Der Rosenkavalier" in 1925. Although one German obituary identified him as a Jew, he had identified himself as a Protestant in Viennese university and residence records from 1894 through 1925. In addition, Wiene had adapted from a novel and directed the 1923 silent religious film I.N.R.I., depicting in a conventional way the events preceding the crucifixion of Christ.

Wiene died in Paris ten days before the end of production of a spy film, Ultimatum, after having suffered from cancer. The film was finished by Wiene's friend Robert Siodmak.

Selected filmography 

Only about 20 of the more than 90 movies in which Robert Wiene collaborated still exist:

Director

	1912	Die Waffen der Jugend (The Weapons of Youth) {probably co-director of Friedrich Müller}
	1914	Er rechts, sie links (He This Way, She That Way)
	1915	Die Konservenbraut (The Canned Bride)
	1915	Der springende Hirsch oder Die Diebe von Günsterburg (The Leaping Stag) (directed together with Walter Turszinsky)
	1916	Höhen und Tiefen (Highs and Lows) {Short film}
	1916	Frau Eva (Mrs. Eva)
	1916	Der Liebesbrief der Königin (The Queen's Love Letter)
	1916	Der Sekretär der Königin (The Queen's Secretary)
	1916	Das wandernde Licht (The Wandering Light)
	1916	Die Räuberbraut (The Robber Bride)
	1916	Der Mann im Spiegel (The Man in the Mirror)
	1916	Lehmanns Brautfahrt (Lehmann's Honeymoon)
	1917	Das Leben ein Traum (Life Is a Dream)
	1917	Der standhafte Benjamin (Steadfast Benjamin)
	1917	Veilchen Nr. 4 (Violet no. 4) {probably director}
	1917	Furcht (Fear)
	1920	Das Cabinet des Dr. Caligari (The Cabinet of Dr. Caligari)
	1920	Die drei Tänze der Mary Wilford (The Three Dances of Mary Wilford)
	1920	Genuine (Genuine)
	1920	Die Nacht der Königin Isabeau (The Night of Queen Isabeau)
	1920	Der Schrecken im Hause Ardon (Panic in the House of Ardon)
	1921	Die Rache einer Frau (A Woman's Revenge)
	1922	Die höllische Macht (The Infernal Power)
	1923	Raskolnikow (Raskolnikow)
	1923	Der Puppenmacher von Kiang-Ning (The Doll Maker of Kiang-Ning)
	1923	I.N.R.I. (I.N.R.I.)
	1924	Orlac’s Hände (The Hands of Orlac)
	1924	Pension Groonen (Boarding House Groonen)
	1925	Der Leibgardist (= Der Gardeoffizier) (The Guardsman)
	1926	Der Rosenkavalier (Der Rosenkavalier)
	1926	Die Königin vom Moulin Rouge (The Queen of Moulin Rouge)
	1927	Die Geliebte (The Mistress)
	1927	Die berühmte Frau (The Famous Woman)
	1928	Die Frau auf der Folter (The Woman on the Rack)
	1928	Leontines Ehemänner (Leontine's Husbands)
	1928	Die grosse Abenteuerin (The Great Adventuress)
	1928	Unfug der Liebe (Folly of Love)
	1930	Der Andere (The Other)
	1930	Le procureur Hallers (The Prosecutor Hallers)
	1931	Nuits de Venise (co-director Pierre Billon)
	1931	Der Liebesexpress (The Love Express)
	1931	Panik in Chicago (Panic in Chicago)
	1933	Polizeiakte 909 (= Taifun) (Typhoon)
	1934	Eine Nacht in Venedig (One Night in Venice)
	1938	Ultimatum (Ultimatum) {finished after his death by Robert Siodmak)

Writer
 The Weapons of Youth (1913)
 The Marriage of Luise Rohrbach (1917)
 Frank Hansen's Fortune (1917)
 Imprisoned Soul (1917)
 The Princess of Neutralia (1917)
 Countess Kitchenmaid (1918)
 The Blue Lantern (1918)
 The Ringwall Family (1918)
 Put to the Test (1918)
 Precious Stones (1918)
 The Lady, the Devil and the Model (1918)
 Agnes Arnau and Her Three Suitors (1918)
 The Homecoming of Odysseus (1918)
 Her Sport (1919)
 The Man of Action (1919)
 Victim of Society (1919)
 A Drive into the Blue (1919)
 The Living Dead (1919)
 Ruth's Two Husbands (1919)
 Diamonds (1920)
 Monika Vogelsang (1920)
 The Adventure of Doctor Kircheisen (1921)
 The Power of Darkness (1924)
 The Guardsman (1925)
 Strauss Is Playing Today (1928)
 Typhoon (1933)

Notes

References
 Jung, Uli & Schatzberg, Walter. Beyond Caligari: The Films of Robert Wiene. Berghahn Books, 1999.

External links 
 
 

1873 births
1938 deaths
German film directors
Film people from Wrocław
Silent film directors
Cinema pioneers
Horror film directors
Jewish emigrants from Nazi Germany to France
Deaths from cancer in France